Othman El Ouamari (born 27 October 2003) is a Belgian professional footballer who plays for RWDM47.

Club career 
Having started his career at Tubize as 4 years old, Othman El Ouamari joined the Standard de Liège academy as an under-15 before eventually choosing to leave for the Racing White Daring de Molenbeek as an under-18, to try to get to senior football more quickly.

Having made his first team debut during the pre-season and signed his first professional contract with the club from Molenbeek in December 2021, El Ouamari made his professional debut for RWDM47 on the 25 January 2022, replacing William Togui during a 2–0 1B Pro League loss against Westerlo.

References

External links 

Pro League profile

2003 births
Living people
Belgian footballers
Association football midfielders
People from Tubize
RWDM47 players
Challenger Pro League players
Footballers from Walloon Brabant